Christy Canavan (born 24 January 1947 in Dublin) is a former Irish football player.

He joined Shamrock Rovers in 1966 making his debut on 20 April that year, and played in the European Cup Winners' Cup win over FC Schalke 04 in 1969.

In July 1971 Canavan, along with Billy Dixon was placed on the transfer list by manager Billy Young.

He signed for Dundalk F.C. in August 1972.

Canavan is related through marriage to Richard Dunne.

Honours
FAI Cup: 1
 Shamrock Rovers - 1969

Sources 
 The Hoops by Paul Doolan and Robert Goggins

References

1947 births
Association footballers from County Dublin
Republic of Ireland association footballers
Shamrock Rovers F.C. players
Dundalk F.C. players
League of Ireland players
Living people
Association footballers not categorized by position